Companion planting in gardening and agriculture is the planting of different crops in proximity for any of a number of different reasons, including pest control, pollination, providing habitat for beneficial insects, maximizing use of space, and to otherwise increase crop productivity. Companion planting is a form of polyculture.

Companion planting is used by farmers and gardeners in both industrialized and developing countries for many reasons. Many of the modern principles of companion planting were present many centuries ago in forest gardens in Asia, and thousands of years ago in Mesoamerica.

History 

In China, mosquito ferns (Azolla spp.) have been used for at least a thousand years as companion plants for rice crops. They host a cyanobacterium (Anabaena azollae) that fixes nitrogen from the atmosphere, and they block light from plants that would compete with the rice.

Companion planting was practiced in various forms by the indigenous peoples of the Americas prior to the arrival of Europeans. These peoples domesticated squash 8,000 to 10,000 years ago, then maize, then common beans, forming the Three Sisters agricultural technique. The cornstalk served as a trellis for the beans to climb, the beans fixed nitrogen, benefitting the maize, and the wide leaves of the squash plant provide ample shade for the soil keeping it moist and fertile.

Practice 

More recently, starting in the 1920s, organic farming and horticulture have made frequent use of companion planting, since many other means of fertilizing, weed reduction and pest control are forbidden.

The list of companion plants used in such systems is large, and includes vegetables, fruit trees, kitchen herbs, garden flowers, and fodder crops. The number of interactions both positive (the pair of species assist each other) and negative (the plants are best not grown together) is also large, though the evidence for such interactions ranges from controlled experiments to hearsay. For example, plants in the cabbage family (Brassicaceae) grow well with celery, onion family plants (Allium), and aromatic herbs, but are best not grown with strawberry or tomato.

Mechanisms 

Companion planting can operate through a variety of mechanisms, which may sometimes be combined. These include pest control, pollination, providing habitat for beneficial insects, and maximizing use of space; all of these may help to increase crop productivity.

Nutrient provision 

Legumes such as clover provide nitrogen compounds to neighbouring plants such as grasses by fixing nitrogen from the air with symbiotic bacteria in their root nodules. These enable the grasses or other neighbours to produce more protein and hence to grow more.

Trap cropping 

Trap cropping uses alternative plants to attract pests away from a main crop. For example, nasturtium (Tropaeolum majus) is a food plant of some caterpillars which feed primarily on members of the cabbage family (brassicas); some gardeners claim that planting them around brassicas protects the food crops from damage, as eggs of the pests are preferentially laid on the nasturtium. However, while many trap crops divert pests from focal crops in small scale greenhouse, garden and field experiments, only a small portion of these plants reduce pest damage at larger commercial scales.

Host-finding disruption 

Flying pests are far less successful if their host-plants are surrounded by other plants or even "decoy-plants" coloured green. Pests find hosts in stages, first detecting plant odours which induce it to try to land on the host plant, avoiding bare soil. If the plant is isolated, then the insect simply lands on the patch of green near the odour, making an "appropriate landing". If it finds itself on the wrong plant, an "inappropriate landing", it takes off and flies to another plant; it eventually leaves the area if there are too many "inappropriate" landings. Companion planting of clover as ground cover was equally disruptive to eight pest species from four different insect orders. In a test, 36% of cabbage root flies laid eggs beside cabbages growing in bare soil (destroying the crop), compared to only 7% beside cabbages growing in clover (which allowed a good crop). Simple decoys of green cardboard worked just as well as the live ground cover.

Pest suppression 

Some companion plants help prevent pest insects or pathogenic fungi from damaging the crop, through chemical means. For example, the smell of the foliage of marigolds is claimed to deter aphids from feeding on neighbouring plants. A 2005 study found that oil volatiles extracted from Mexican marigold by vacuum distillation reduced the reproduction of three aphid species (pea aphid, green peach aphid and glasshouse and potato aphid) by up to 100% after 5 days from exposure. Another example familiar to gardeners is the interaction of onions and carrots with each other's pests: the onion smell puts off carrot root fly, while the smell of carrots puts off onion fly.

Predator recruitment 

Companion plants that produce copious nectar or pollen in a vegetable garden (insectary plants) may help encourage higher populations of beneficial insects that control pests.

Protective shelter  

Some crops are grown under the protective shelter of different kinds of plant, whether as wind breaks or for shade. For example, shade-grown coffee, especially Coffea arabica, has traditionally been grown in light shade created by scattered trees with a thin canopy, allowing light through to the coffee bushes but protecting them from overheating. Suitable Asian trees include Erythrina subumbrans (tton tong or dadap), Gliricidia sepium (khae falang), Cassia siamea (khi lek), Melia azedarach (khao dao sang), and Paulownia tomentosa, a useful timber tree.

Approaches 

Companion planting approaches in use or being trialled include:

 Square foot gardening attempts to protect plants from issues such as weed infestation by packing them as closely together as possible. This is facilitated by using companion plants, which can be closer together than normal.
 Forest gardening, where companion plants are intermingled to simulate an ecosystem, emulates the interaction of plants of up to seven different heights in a woodland.

See also 

 Satoyama
 Intercropping
 Ecological facilitation
 Vegan organic gardening
 Three Sisters (agriculture)
 List of beneficial weeds
 List of pest-repelling plants

References 

Sustainable gardening
Permaculture
Crops
Biological pest control
Sustainable technologies
Chemical ecology